The Goddess of 1967 is a 2000 Australian film directed by Macau-born Australian Clara Law, who wrote the script with her husband (and previous script collaborator) Eddie Ling-Ching Fong.
The film is about a rich young Japanese man (Rikiya Kurokawa), who travels to Australia with the intention of buying a Citroën DS car (the goddess of the film's title - nicknamed the Déesse, after its initials in French, déesse being French for "goddess") that he has found for sale on the internet. Once there, things do not go as planned and he ends up on a road trip with a blind girl (Rose Byrne).

It won several awards, including Best Actress for Rose Byrne at the 2000 Venice Film Festival and best director at the Chicago Film Festival.

The song from the dance scene between BG and JM is Walk-Don't Run (the 1964 version) by The Ventures.  The song is not included on the film's soundtrack, which contains the score by Jen Anderson.

Plot

The storyline opens in Tokyo where JM (Rikiya Kurokawa), a rich young IT worker and sometime computer hacker, is attempting to purchase a 1967 model Citroën DS, or Goddess, as it is known to French car aficionados. JM lives in a pristine but unfriendly hi-tech apartment. The smog filled city is blue-grey and bleak. He rarely speaks to his live-in girlfriend and is preoccupied with other possessions—his latest snorkeling gear as well as the pet snakes and other exotic reptiles he keeps in the flat. After tracing, on the Internet, a perfectly restored Citroën owned by a couple in Australia, JM abandons his job and flies out to purchase the rare car, which he thinks can fill the emptiness in his life.

No one meets JM at the airport but he eventually finds the home where the car is located and meets BG (Rose Byrne), a blind and emotionally unstable young woman. BG, who is minding a young child, explains that the couple did not actually own the Citroën and that the husband shot his wife and then killed himself after a violent argument over money. She shows him the car and tells him, after he has test driven it, that she can take him to its real owner, who is somewhere in the Outback, a five-day drive away. Intoxicated by the vehicle, JM agrees. BG abandons the child at a service station, instructing her not to trust anyone, after calling the police to pick the girl up.

As BG and JM journey into the spectacular but harsh landscape, the viewer is taken on a series of complex and often confusing flashbacks which attempt to illustrate the dark tragedies that have shaped their respective lives. JM became fabulously wealthy after a friend gave him the computer password to a major bank. The friend, who claims the reason he is not using the password himself is that he is getting married, is run over and killed by a passing truck. JM's infatuation with the car is apparently an attempt to fill the emotional gap created by his friend's death and the barren life he leads in Tokyo, which, he tells BG, is alien and "just like Mars".

Flashbacks reveal BG was sexually attacked three years earlier by a young boxer from a travelling circus, who is frustrated in his attempts by a Chastity belt. BG then escaped into the bush where she was protected by wild dingoes. As a young child, she was also sexually abused by her grandfather (who is her blood father) and traumatised by Marie (Elise McCredie), her disoriented and deeply religious mother. Grandpa (Nicholas Hope), who was a hippie, a wine maker and then an opal miner, believes his outback existence frees him from all moral constraints.

BG's favourite radio show is the obituary notices program and she is infatuated by the sound of insects splattering on the Citroën's windscreen, which, she explains to JM, is the "sound of death". Although blind, BG carries a pistol which she fires occasionally: the first time at two sinister men who pull alongside the car during JM's test drive and later, in the outback, to destroy the radio she uses to listen to the obituary notices. Unbeknownst to JM, BG's grandfather owns the car and she is leading JM to him not to consummate the car's sale but in order to kill the old man.

In the course of their journey through an unremittingly hostile world inhabited by cruel outback men and women, the couple become friends and, after JM teaches BG how to dance, tentative lovers. BG eventually finds her grandfather and confronts him in his rundown opal mine. She had planned to shoot him but, having reconciled her past in the course of the trip and found someone who genuinely cares for her, decides not to go ahead with it. The film ends with BG and JM travelling off together in the Citroën, both having come to terms with their past.

Production Details
The budget for the film was around AUD$3m. The film was shot in Tokyo and in and around Lightning Ridge in New South Wales, Australia in late 1999.

Box office
The Goddess of 1967 grossed $103,449 at the box office in Australia.

See also
 Cold Fever – a 1995 film in which a successful Japanese man travels to Iceland in a newly purchased bright red Citroën DS and meets strange characters.
 My Blueberry Nights – a 2007 film in which a woman drifts throughout America to buy a car she had always wanted, which her companion uses on a road trip to confront her father.

References

External links

The Goddess of 1967 at the National Film and Sound Archive
The Goddess of 1967 at Ozmovies

2000 films
2000 comedy-drama films
Australian comedy-drama films
Incest in film
Films about blind people
Films directed by Clara Law
Films shot in New South Wales
Films shot in Tokyo
2000s English-language films